The Munster Minor Football Championship is an annual Gaelic football competition organised by the Munster Council of the Gaelic Athletic Association since 1928 for the youngest competitors (under-18) in the province of Munster in Ireland. It is currently sponsored by Electric Ireland and therefore officially known as the Electric Ireland Munster GAA Football Minor Championship.

The series of games are played during the summer months with the Munster final currently being played on the second Sunday in July. The minor final provides the curtain-raiser to the senior final. The winning team is presented with the Tadhg Crowley Cup. This was presented by Munster Council in 1990 to commemorate Tadhg Crowley, who was elected as Munster Council Treasurer in 1968 and served until his death in December 1989. The championship had always been played on a straight knockout basis whereby once a team lost they are eliminated from the series; however, in recent years the championship has expanded to include a first-round losers' group.

The Munster Championship is an integral part of the wider All-Ireland Minor Football Championship.  The winners of the Munster final, like their counterparts in the other provincial championships, are rewarded by advancing to the quarter-final stage of the All-Ireland series of games. The losers of the Munster final also enter the All-Ireland series at the quarter-final stage.

Top winners

List of finals

References

Sources
 Roll of Honour on www.gaainfo.com
 Complete Roll of Honour on Kilkenny GAA bible

All-Ireland Minor Football Championship
 Munster
1